Hobbseus cristatus, the Crested Riverlet Crayfish, is a species of crayfish in the family Cambaridae. It is endemic to Mississippi in the United States.

References

Further reading

 
 

Cambaridae
Articles created by Qbugbot
Crustaceans described in 1955
Taxa named by Horton H. Hobbs Jr.
Endemic fauna of Mississippi